Schneckenburger is a German surname. It may refer to:

Manfred Schneckenburger (1938–2019), German art historian and curator of modern and contemporary art
Max Schneckenburger (1819–1849), German poet
Wilhelm Schneckenburger (1891–1944), German general in the Wehrmacht of Nazi Germany during World War II